Jemma Powell (born 25 July 1980) is a British actress. She is known for portraying Barbara Wright in several Doctor Who audio stories.

Career
Powell made her screen debut in 2001, in The Hole. She is known for her roles in films such as François Ozon's Angel and Tim Burton's Alice in Wonderland.  She played Maliika in Dan Wilde's Alpha Male also starring Danny Huston and Jennifer Ehle. Powell also played screen actress Jacqueline Hill in the Doctor Who spin-off drama An Adventure in Space and Time, which showed how the popular science fiction series was created, in 2013, and has also recorded several audio plays starring as Hill's on-screen character Barbara Wright since 2017.

Her theatre work includes The Cherry Orchard, directed by Dominic Dromgoole. She played Anya.

Personal life and family 
Jemma is married to the English singer-songwriter Jack Savoretti. They have three children.

Filmography

References

External links 
 

English film actresses
Living people
English stage actresses
21st-century English actresses
Alumni of the Oxford School of Drama
1980 births